Bola has been used as both a surname and a given name. Notable people with the name include:

Given name
 Bola Abimbola (born c. 1968), vocalist from Lagos, Nigeria
 Bola Afonja (born 1943), Nigerian politician
 Bola Agbaje (born 1981), British playwright of Nigerian origin
 Bola Ajibola (born 1934), Attorney General and the Minister of Justice of Nigeria from 1985 to 1991
 Bola Akindele (born 1963), Nigerian entrepreneur, business strategist and philanthropist
 Bola Are (born 1954), Nigerian gospel singer
 Bola de Nieve (1911–1971), Cuban singer-pianist and songwriter
 Bola Ige (1930–2001), Nigerian lawyer and politician
 Bola Ikulayo (1948–2016), Nigerian professor of sport psychology
 Bola Johnson (1947–2014), Nigerian musician
 Bola Kuforiji-Olubi (1936–2016), Nigerian politician and banker
 Bola Odeleke (born 1950), Nigerian pastor
 Bola Sete (1923–1987), Brazilian guitarist
 Bola Shagaya (born 1959), Nigerian businesswoman and fashion enthusiast
 Bola Tinubu (born 1952), President-elect of Nigeria

Surname
 Bobo Bola (born 1985), Rwandan football player
 Kelemedi Bola (born 1981), Fijian rugby union footballer
 Marc Bola (born 1997), English professional footballer
 Olalekan Bola (born 1992), Nigerian footballer
 Samu Bola (born 1983), Fijian rugby union footballer
 Theresa Anyuat Bola, South Sudanese politician

See also
Bolla (name)